This is a list of member organisations of the International Union of Socialist Youth, listed by region.

Africa
  — Juventude do Partido - MPLA (MPLA Youth)
  — Jeunesse Parti Social Democrate (Youth of Social Democratic Party)
  — Jeunesse du Parti pour la Democratie et le Progresse/Parti Socialiste (Youth of the Party for Democracy and Progress/Socialist Party)
  — Jeunesse du Front Social Democratique (Social Democratic Front Youth)
  — Juventude do Partido Africano da Independencia de Cabo Verde (Youth of PAICV)
  — Convergencia para la Democracia Social (Youth of the Convergence for Social Democracy)
  — Union des Jeunesses Joseph Rendjambe (Joseph Rendjambe Youth League)
  — Jeunesse ADEMA/Parti Africaine pour la Solidarité et la Justice (Youth of ADEMA/African Party for Solidarity and Justice)
  — Union de la Jeunesse Rassemblement Pour le Mali (Rally for Mali Youth League)
  — Chabiba Ittihadia (Ittihadia Youth)
  — Organizaçao da Juventude Moçambicana (Mozambican Youth Organization/FRELIMO Youth)
  — Organisation de Jeunesse du Taraya (Youth Organization of Taraya)
  — Mouvement National des Jeunesses Socialistes (National Movement of Socialist Youth)
  — African National Congress Youth League
  — Swaziland Youth Congress
  — Umoja wa Vijana wa Chama Cha Mapinduzi (CCM Youth League)
  — Uganda Young Democrats (UYD)
  - Unión de Juventud de Saguia el Hamra y Río de Oro (UJSARIO)

Americas
  — Argentine Socialist Youth
  — Franja Morada
  — League of Young Socialists of the Barbados Labour Party
  — Juventud del Movimiento Sin Miedo (Youth of the Without Fear Movement)
  — Juventude Socialista-PDT (Socialist Youth-PDT)
  — New Democratic Youth of Canada
  — Juventud del Partido por la Democracia (Youth of the Party for Democracy)
  — Juventud Radical Socialdemócrata de Chile (Social Democratic Radical Youth of Chile)
  — Juventud Socialista de Chile (Socialist Youth of Chile)
  — Juventudes Liberales de Colombia (Liberal Youth of Colombia)
  — Juventud Liberacionista (Liberationist Youth)
  — Juventud Revolucionaria Dominicana (Dominican Revolutionary Youth)
  — Juventud de Izquierda Democrática (Democratic Left Youth)
  — Juventud Pinuista (Pinuist Youth)
  — People's National Party Youth Organisation
  — Juventud Demócrata, PRD (Democratic Youth, PRD) 
  — Frente de la Juventud del PRD (PRD Youth Front)
  — Juventud Revolucionaria Febrerista (Febrerist Revolutionary Youth)
  - Juventud País Solidario (Solidarity Country Youth)
  — Juventud Aprista Peruana (Peruvian Aprista Youth)
  — Juventud del PIP (PIP Youth)
  — Juventud Nuevo Espacio (New Space Youth)
  — Juventud Socialista del Uruguay (Socialist Youth of Uruguay)
  — Juventud de Acción Democrática (Youth of Democratic Action)
  — Juventud del Movimiento al Socialismo (Youth of the Movement for Socialism)

Asia-Pacific
  — Youth Organisation of Bhutan
  — Youth for a New Society
  — Pergerakan Indonesia
  — Social Democratic Party of Japan - Youth Bureau
  — Democratic Action Party Socialist Youth
  — Mongolian Democratic Socialist Youth Union
  — Nepal Students Union
  — Nepal Tarun Dal
  — New Zealand Young Labour
  — Akbayan Youth
  — Young Progressives for Social Democracy Movement, Thailand-YPD

Europe
  — Forumi i Rinisë Eurosocialiste të Shqipërisë (Eurosocialist Youth Forum of Albania)
  — Rinisë Socialdemokrate (Social Democratic Youth of Albania)
  — Armenian Youth Federation
  — Sozialistische Jugend Österreichs (Socialist Youth Austria)
  — Verband Sozialistischer StudentInnen Österreichs (Socialist Students of Austria)
  — Social Democratic Youth Organisation of Azerbaijan
  — MSD - Maladaja Hramada (Youth Social Democrats)
  — Animo
  — Young Socialists Movement (Youth Socialists Movement)
  — Forum mladih SDP BiH (SDP Youth Forum)
  — Mladezhko Obedinenie v BSP (Bulgarian Socialist Party's Youth Union)
  — Evropejska Ljava Mladezhka Alternativa (European Left Youth Alternative)
  — Forum mladih SDP (SDP Youth Forum)
  — Socijaldemokratska studentska unija Hrvatske (SSU) (Social Democratic Student Union)
  — Neolea Sosialdimokraton (Social Democratic Youth)
  — Mladí sociální demokraté (Youth Social Democrats)
  — Danmarks Socialdemokratiske Ungdom (Social Democratic Youth of Denmark)
  — Estonian Social Democratic Youth
  — Sosialistisk Ung (Social Democratic Youth of the Faroe Islands)
  — Sosialdemokraattiset Opiskelijat (Social Democratic Students)
  — Sosialdemokraattiset Nuoret (Social Democratic Youth)
  — Mouvement des jeunes socialistes (France) (Young Socialists Movement)
  — Young Socialists of Georgia
  — Jusos in der SPD (Young Socialists in the SPD)
  — Sozialistische Jugend Deutschlands – Die Falken (Socialist Youth of Germany – Falcons)
  — Neolaia PASOK (PASOK Youth)
  — Siumut Youth
  — Societas - Új Mozgalom (Societas - New Movement)
  — Ungir jafnaðarmenn
  — Labour Youth
  — Federazione dei Giovani Socialisti (Federation of Young Socialists)
  — Giovani Democratici (Young Democrats)
  — Restart.lv
  — Lietuvos socialdemokratinio jaunimo sąjunga (Lithuanian Social Democratic Youth Union)
  — Jeunesses Socialistes Luxembourgeoises (Luxembourg Socialist Youths)
  — Socijaldemokratskata mladina na Makedonija (Social Democratic Youth of Macedonia)
  — Labour Youth Forum
  — Socijaldemokratska omladina Crne Gore (Social Democratic Youth of Montenegro)
  — Democratic Youth
  — Jonge Socialisten (Young Socialists in the PvdA)
  — Arbeidernes Ungdoms Fylking (Worker's Youth League)
  — Federacji Młodych Socjaldemokratów (Social Democratic Youth Federation)
  — Federacja Młodych Unii Pracy (Union of Labour Youth Federation)
  — Juventude Socialista (Socialist Youth)
  — Tineretul Social Democrat (Social Democratic Youth)
  — Российский социал-демократический союз молодёжи (Russian Social Democratic Union of Youth)
  — Area Giovani Socialisti Sammarinesi (Area Socialist Youth of San Marino)
  — Demokratska omladina (Democratic Youth)
  — Socijaldemokratska omladina (Social Democratic Youth)
  — Mladí sociálni demokrati (Youth Social Democrats)
  — Mladi forum Socialnih Demokratov (Young Forum of Social Democrats)
  — Juventudes Socialistas de España (Socialist Youth of Spain)
  — Joventut Socialista de Catalunya (Socialist Youth of Catalonia)
  — Socialdemokratiska Studentförbundet (Social Democratic Students of Sweden)
  — Sveriges Socialdemokratiska Ungdomsförbund (Social Democratic Youth League of Sweden)
  — JungsozialistInnen Schweiz / Jeunesse socialiste suisse / Gioventù Socialista Svizzera (Young Socialists Switzerland)
  — Socialist Youth Union (Ukraine)
  — CHP Gençlik Kolları (CHP Youth)
  — Labour Students
  — Young Labour

Middle East
  — Shabibet Fateh (Fatah Youth)
  — Mishmeret Tse'irah shel Mifleget Ha'Avoda (Young Guard of the Labour Party)
  — Young Meretz, Meretz Youth
  — Lawan (Democratic Youth Union of Iranian Kurdistan)
  — Kurdish Youth and Freedom Organisation
  — Kurdistan Students Association
   — Progressive Youth Organisation

Observers
  — Youth Movement for Integration
  — Juventud Movimiento Al Socialismo (Youth of the Movement for Socialism)
  — Botswana National Front Youth League
  — All Burma Students League
  — AGONAS (Democratic Movement of Cypriot Students)
  — Youth of the United Democratic Party
  — Juventude Africana Amilcar Cabral (African Youth Amilcar Cabral)
  — Democratic Students Union of Iranian Kurdistan
  — DYUEK (Democratic Youth Union of East Kurdistan)
  — Northern Ireland — SDLP Youth
  — General Union of Palestine Students
  — Student Council Alliance of Philippines
  — Молодые социалисты России (Young Socialists of Russia)
  — Lige Socijaldemokratske Vojvođanske Omladine (League of Social Democratic Youth of Vojvodina)
  - Justice Party Youth "Momentum"
  — Taiwan Labour Front
  — Tibetan Youth Congress
  — Youth and Students' Organization of Timor-Leste
  — Convention Démocratique des Peuples Africains (Democratic Convention of African Peoples)
  — Social Democratic Perspective

References

Lists of organizations
Socialist organizations